The Discalced Carmelites, known officially as the Order of the Discalced Brothers of the Blessed Virgin Mary of Mount Carmel or the Order of Discalced Carmelites (abbrev.: OCD; sometimes called in earlier times), is a Catholic mendicant order with roots in the eremitic tradition of the Desert Fathers and Mothers. The order was established in the 16th century, pursuant to the reform of the Carmelite Order by two Spanish saints, Teresa of Ávila (foundress) and John of the Cross (co-founder). Discalced is derived from Latin, meaning "without shoes".

The Carmelite Order, from which the Discalced Carmelites branched off, is also referred to as the Carmelites of the Ancient Observance to distinguish them from their discalced offshoot. The third order affiliated to the Discalced Carmelites is the Secular Order of Discalced Carmelites.

Background 
The Discalced Carmelites are friars and nuns who dedicate themselves to a life of prayer. The Carmelite nuns live in cloistered (enclosed) monasteries and follow a completely contemplative life. The Carmelite friars, while following a contemplative life, also engage in the promotion of spirituality through their retreat centres, parishes and churches. Lay people, known as the Secular Order, follow their contemplative call in their everyday activities. Devotion to the Virgin Mary is a characteristic of Carmelites and is symbolised by wearing the brown scapular.

Carmelites trace their roots and their name to Mount Carmel in the Holy Land. There, in the 13th century, a band of European men gathered together to live a simple life of prayer. Their first chapel was dedicated to the Blessed Virgin Mary and they called themselves the Brothers of the Blessed Virgin Mary of Mount Carmel.

The Muhraka monastery on the top of Mount Carmel near Haifa in Israel is a historic Carmelite monastery. The monastery stands on the place where the prophet Elijah is said to have lived and fought the prophets of Baal.

The first Carmelites were pilgrims to Mount Carmel who settled there in solitude. These early hermits were mostly laity, who lived a life of poverty, penance and prayer. Between 1206 and 1214, Albert Avogadro, the Patriarch of Jerusalem, brought the hermits on Mount Carmel together into community. At their request he wrote them a rule, which expressed their own intention and reflected the spirit of the pilgrimage to the Holy Land and of the early community of Jerusalem. They were also inspired by the prophet Elijah, who had been associated with Mount Carmel. The words of Elijah, "With zeal have I been zealous for the Lord God of hosts" (IKg 19:10) appear on the Carmelite crest. Around 1238, within fifty years of receiving their rule, the Carmelite hermits were forced by the Saracens to leave Mount Carmel and to settle in Europe.

Founding 

A combination of political and social conditions that prevailed in Europe in the fourteenth to sixteenth centuries – the Hundred Years' War, Black Plague, the Reformation and the Humanist revival – adversely affected the Order. Many Carmelites and even whole communities succumbed to contemporary attitudes and conditions diametrically opposed to their original vocation. To meet this situation the rule was "mitigated" several times. Consequently, the Carmelites bore less and less resemblance to the first hermits of Mount Carmel.

Teresa of Avila considered the surest way to prayer to be a return to Carmel's authentic vocation. A group of nuns assembled in her cell one September evening in 1560, taking their inspiration from the primitive tradition of Carmel and the discalced reform of Peter of Alcantara, a controversial movement within Spanish Franciscanism, proposed to found a monastery of an eremitical kind.

With few resources and often bitter opposition, Teresa succeeded in 1562 in establishing a small monastery with the austerity of desert solitude within the heart of the city of Ávila, Spain, combining eremitical and community life. On 24 August 1562, the new Convent of St. Joseph was founded. Teresa's rule, which retained a distinctively Marian character, contained exacting prescriptions for a life of continual prayer, safeguarded by strict enclosure and sustained by the asceticism of solitude, manual labor, perpetual abstinence, fasting, and fraternal charity. In addition to this, Teresa envisioned an order fully dedicated to poverty.

Working in close collaboration with Teresa was John of the Cross, who with Anthony of Jesus founded the first convent of Discalced Carmelite friars in Duruelo, Spain on 28 November 1568.

The Discalced Carmelites were established as a separate province of the Carmelite Order by the decree Pia consideratione of Pope Gregory XIII on 22 June 1580. By this decree the Discalced Carmelites were still subject to the Prior General of the Carmelite Order in Rome, but were otherwise distinct from the Carmelites in that they could elect their own superiors and author their own constitutions for their common life. The following Discalced Carmelite Chapter at Alcala de Henares, Spain in March 1581 established the constitutions of the Discalced Carmelites and elected the first provincial of the Discalced Carmelites, Jerome Gratian. This office was later translated into that of Superior General of the Discalced Carmelites.

The Carmelite charism 

The heart of the Carmelite charism is prayer and contemplation. The quality of prayer determines the quality of the community life and the quality of the service which is offered to others. Prayer and contemplation for the Carmelite are not private matters between the individual and God but are to be shared with others since the charism is given for the whole world. Therefore, there is an emphasis in the order on the ministry of teaching prayer and giving spiritual direction.

For a Carmelite, prayer is guided by the teachings and experience of Teresa of Ávila and John of the Cross, as well as the saints who have followed in their steps, such as Thérèse of the Child Jesus and of the Holy Face, Elizabeth of the Trinity, Teresa of the Andes, and martyrs such as Teresa Benedicta of the Cross, Père Jacques and the sixteen Martyrs of Compiegne. Fraternity, service, and contemplation are essential values for all Carmelites.

When the Carmelites were forced to leave Mount Carmel, they changed their practice from being hermits to friars. The major difference is that friars are called to serve the People of God in some active apostolate. Some congregations were founded for a specific work, but the Carmelite Order tries to respond to what it sees as the needs of the church and the world - which differ according to time and place. Many friars work in such institutions as parishes, schools, universities, retreat centres, prisons and hospitals. Each individual friar will serve in roles depending on the perceived needs of the people with whom he lives and his own particular talents.

Each day is marked by silence for prayer. In addition to the daily celebration of the full Liturgy of the Hours, two hours (one in the morning, one in the evening) are set aside for silent prayer. Communities should not have more than 21 members. The friars practice a broadly-based discipline of study.

Bishops

Living bishops (4 archbishops, 18 bishops)

Deceased Bishops (7 cardinals, 14 archbishops, 52 bishops)

Communities of Carmelite tradition 
 Byzantine Discalced Carmelites
 Carmelites of Mary Immaculate
 Carmelites of the Ancient Observance
 Hermits of the Most Blessed Virgin Mary of Mount Carmel
 Monks of the Most Blessed Virgin Mary of Mount Carmel
 Secular Order of Discalced Carmelites
 Sisters of the Apostolic Carmel
 Third Order of Our Lady of Mount Carmel
 Episcopal Carmel of Saint Teresa

See also 
 Book of the First Monks
 Constitutions of the Carmelite Order

References

External links 

 
 No Greater Love, a 2009 documentary about the nuns at the monastery of the Most Holy Trinity, in London's Notting Hill

 
Spanish hermits

1593 establishments in Europe
Religious organizations established in the 1590s
Carmelite spirituality
Catholic religious orders established in the 16th century
Catholic missionary orders